Suelyn Farel (born December 10, 1968) is an American businesswoman, CEO and co-founder of the Julien Farel Group, a New York City based beauty and "wellness" company, and the former CEO and founder of B Squared, a New York City printing & graphic design company.

Early life 
Suelyn Farel was born and raised in Westchester County, New York. Her father was a teacher for over 30 years and inducted into the National Teachers Hall of Fame and her mother had a career at IBM in marketing and human resources. Suelyn graduated from Boston University in three years with a BS in Marketing & Finance.

Julien Farel Group 
Spearheading product development for Julien Farel Products International in 2007, Julien Farel Anti-Aging Haircare launched in 2011 and quickly expanded globally into the United Kingdom, France, Italy, Germany, and Switzerland. Simultaneously in the US, Suelyn worked on the development and execution of the brand flagship, Julien Farel Restore Salon & Spa, a salon, spa and fitness destination inside Loews Regency New York. With the success of the haircare line and flagship, Loews Hotel now distributes Julien Farel Haircare products at hotel locations nationwide. As brand Founder & CEO, Suelyn recently became the on-air talent for QVC Europe in early 2016 and won the QVC Customer Beauty Award in 2016.

Distribution of Julien Farel Haircare products can found at the following specialty retailers: Bergdorf Goodman in New York City, Selfridges in London, Le Bon Marche in Paris, La Rinascente in Milan and Rome, Sephora in Italy, Globus in Switzerland.

US Open 
In 2007, Farel became the Hairstylists to the Players for the US Open Tennis Tournament.   US Open.  There, Julien provided hair cuts and grooming on-site to those involved in the Open, including players, coaches, and United States Tennis Association (USTA) executives.

Personal life 
Suelyn married Julien Farel in October 2004 at Villa Ephrussi de Rothschild in Saint Jean Cap Ferrat, France.  The couple has two daughters and they reside in New York City.

References

1968 births
Living people
People from Westchester County, New York
American company founders
American women company founders
Boston University School of Management alumni
Businesspeople from New York City
American women chief executives
21st-century American women